Mallard is the eponymous debut by the group Mallard, who formed after tensions between them and Captain Beefheart exploded, causing them to leave his band (though the album's last track is a Beefheart composition).  It was reissued as a CD with the band's other album, In a Different Climate, added on.

Mallard got their start with the help of Jethro Tull's Ian Anderson: he lent them his mobile studio for their work (he is thanked in the liner notes).  Neither album achieved any sort of commercial success.

Track listing Mallard album
All songs copyright Virgin Music Publishers Ltd. (except where noted)

LP Side one
"Back On The Pavement" (Lyrics: David Wagstaff; Music: Bill Harkleroad) 3:09
"She's Long and She's Lean" (Lyrics: Ted Alvy; Music: Bill Harkleroad, Mark Boston) 3:15
"Road to Morrocco" — instrumental (Music: Bill Harkleroad, Mark Boston) 2:58
"One Day Once" (Lyrics: John French; Music: Bill Harkleroad) 3:25
"Yellow" — instrumental (Music: Bill Harkleroad) 2:22
"Desperados Waiting for a Train" (Music and Lyrics: Guy Clark; Arr. Jim Dickinson) 3:30

LP Side two
"A Piece of Me" (Lyrics: Bill Harkleroad, John French; Music: Bill Harkleroad) 4:36
"Reign of Pain" (Lyrics: Dan Moore; Music: Bill Harkleroad, John French) 3:03
"South of The Valley" (Music and Lyrics: John French; Arr. Bill Harkleroad) 4:48
"Winged Tuskadero" (Lyrics: David Wagstaff; Music: Bill Harkleroad) 3:18
"Peon" — instrumental (Don Van Vliet aka Captain Beefheart; Copyright Kama Sutra Music Ltd.) 3:26

Track listing In A Different Climate
(P) 1976 Virgin Records Ltd. 
Produced by Robert John Lange (Released 1977 in USA via CBS Records)

LP Side one 
"Green Coyote" (4:15) L: David Wagstaff M: Bill Harkleroad/Mark Boston
"Your Face On Someone Else" (4:30) David Wagstaff /Bill Harkleroad/John Thomas
"Harvest" (3:40) L: David Wagstaff M: John Thomas
"Mama Squeeze" (4:04) L: Ted Alvy/Bill Harkleroad M: Bill Harkleroad

LP Side two 
"Heartstrings" - instrumental (8:08) Bill Harkleroad/John Thomas
"Old Man Grey" LM: Mark Boston segues
"Texas Weather" (4:32) L: Ted Alvy M: Bill Harkleroad
"Big Foot" (4:39) L: Ted Alvy/Bill Harkleroad M: Bill Harkleroad

In 1994, both LPs by Mallard were re-released on CD by Virgin Records in the UK and in the USA.

Personnel

Mallard
Sam Galpin: vocals, piano on "Desperados Waiting For A Train"
Bill Harkleroad: electric and acoustic guitars
Mark Boston: bass, vocals on "Winged Tuskadero"
Art Tripp III: drums, percussion, marimba
plus Barry Morgan: Latin percussion on "Reign Of Pain"
Rabbit Bundrick: Fender Rhodes on "One Day Once", "A Piece Of Me" and "Reign Of Pain"

In A Different Climate
Sam Galpin: vocals
Bill Harkleroad: guitars
Mark Boston: bass guitar, dobro (vocals on "Old Man Grey")
John Thomas: keyboards and backing vocals
George Draggota: drums
plus John McFee: pedal steel guitar on "Harvest"

Production
Produced by Robin Black and Bill Harkleroad
Recorded, engineered and mixed By Robin Black; assistant engineers: Dave Harris, Trevor White

References

External links
"Mallard" at discogs
"Mallard" Web Pages since September 1995
Watergaard, Sean; [ "Mallard" review] at allmusic (Retrieved September 27, 2010)

1975 debut albums
Albums produced by Robert John "Mutt" Lange
Virgin Records albums